Santa Vitória is a municipality in the west of the Brazilian state of Minas Gerais. , the population was estimated at 19,872. It became a municipality in 1948.

It belongs to the statistical microregion of Ituiutaba. Neighboring municipalities are São Simão, União de Minas, Limeira do Oeste, Campina Verde and Gurinhatã.

History
Settlement began in the beginning of the nineteenth century with the cattle ranch called São Jerônimo. The region was occupied by the Caiapó Indians who were dominated and expelled. The region was covered by forests and malaria was endemic. The first church appeared in 1904, followed by the cemetery in 1905. Santa Vitória belonged to the municipality of Ituiutaba, becoming a separate municipality in 1948.

Economy
The most important economic activities are cattle raising, commerce and agriculture. The GDP in 2017 was R$721,332,990.00. Santa Vitória is in the top tier of municipalities in the state with regard to economic and social development. It is in a region of good soils, adequate rainfall, and abundance of surface water. As of 2018 there were three bank branches in the town. There was a small retail commerce serving the surrounding area of cattle and agricultural lands. In the rural area there were 972 establishments giving employment to 4,757 persons. 411 of the farms had tractors. There were 11,079 vehicles throughout the municipality. There were 210,939 head of cattle in 2017.

Cattle production is important with a large herd. Cattle are raised for meat and milk. Eighteen producers are specialized in milk production. In 2006 there were 23,000 dairy cattle. There is also a substantial swine industry.

Health and education
In the health sector there were 21 facilities, one of which is a hospital with 29 beds. In the educational sector there were 11 primary schools and 3 secondary schools.

Municipal Human Development Index: 0.759 (2000)
State ranking: 214 out of 853 municipalities as of 2000
National ranking: 1,604 out of 5,138 municipalities as of 2000

References

See also
 List of municipalities in Minas Gerais

Municipalities in Minas Gerais
Populated places established in 1948
1948 establishments in Brazil